The Rugby Americas North Championship, known before the 2016 edition as the NACRA Rugby Championship, is a championship for Tier 3 members of Rugby Americas North in men's 15-a-side rugby union. The United States and Canada, the two tier 2 sides in the North American region, take part in the Rugby Americas Championship, the "Americas 6 Nations", instead but a team representing the United States South regional association, USA South do take part.

The current format of the tournament contains both a geographical and divisional element with promotion and relegation. All the teams are split between the North and South. Within that geographical split, teams are then split into the Championship (higher division) and the Cup (lower division). The highest placed team in each Cup plays the bottom team in their respective Championship for promotion. As of 2017, the Southern region does not have a Cup division.

Finally, the winner of the North championship plays the winner of the South championship in the RAN Championship final to decide the winner of the overall tournament.

Champions
Champions by year:

Notes

 
Rugby union competitions in North America
Rugby union competitions in the Caribbean
2001 establishments in North America